The Dexter is an Irish breed of small cattle. It originated in the eighteenth century in County Kerry, in south-western Ireland, and appears to be named after a man named Dexter, who was factor of the estates of Lord Hawarden on Valentia Island. Until the second half of the nineteenth century it was considered a type within the Kerry breed.

History 

The Dexter breed originated in south-western Ireland, from where it was brought to England in 1882. The breed virtually disappeared in Ireland, but was still maintained as a pure breed in a number of small herds in England and the US.

Characteristics 

Considering their small size, their bodies are broad and deep with well-rounded hindquarters. Dexters have three coat colours - black, red, and dun (brown). Dexters should have no white markings except for some minor white markings on the belly/udder behind the navel and some white hairs in the tail switch. While many Dexters are naturally hornless (polled), many have horns that are rather small and thick and grow outward with a forward curve on the male and upward on the female. 

Dexters are classified as a small dual-purpose breed, used for milk and beef, but they are often listed as a triple-purpose breed, since they are also used as oxen. Management practices vary by breeder and country. Their versatility is one of their greatest assets, and probably has something to do with the number of countries where Dexter cattle are found, including North America, South Africa, Australia, and much of Europe.

The cows are exceptionally good mothers, hiding their calves almost from birth if they have cover for them to hide. Some produce enough milk to feed two or three calves, and often willingly nurse calves from other cows. They are known for easy calving. This trait, along with the smaller size of the calf, has produced a small but growing market in the United States for Dexter bulls to breed to first-calf heifers among the larger beef breeds to eliminate problems at calving.

Some Dexter cattle carry a gene for chondrodysplasia (a semilethal gene), which is a form of dwarfism that results in shorter legs than unaffected cattle.  Chondrodysplasia-affected Dexters are typically 6–8 in shorter in height than unaffected ones. Breeding two chondrodysplasia-affected Dexters together results in a 25% chance that the foetus can abort prematurely. A DNA test is available to test for the chondrodysplasia gene, using tail hairs from the animal.

The aborted foetus is commonly called a bulldog,  a stillborn calf that has a bulging head, compressed nose,  protruding lower jaw, and swollen tongue, as well as extremely short limbs. The occurrence of bulldog foetuses is higher in calves born with a black coat than a red coat, because black coat colour is more common. Short-legged Dexter cattle are considered to be heterozygous, while bulldog foetuses are homozygous for chondrodysplasia genes.

Dexters can also be affected with pulmonary hypoplasia with anasarca (PHA), which is an incomplete formation of the lungs with accumulation of a serum fluid in various parts of the tissue of the foetus. Unlike chondrodysplasia, which has many physical signs, PHA shows no outward signs and is only detectable through DNA testing. As with Chondrodysplasia, PHA-affected Dexters should not be bred together.

Originally, Dexters were typically horned, but a naturally polled strain was developed in the 1990s.

Dexter cattle have short legs compared to other breeds; increased shortness is displayed from the knee to the fetlock.

Dexter cattle are very hardy, efficient grazers and are able to thrive on poor land.

Use 

The breed is suitable for beef or milk production, although individual herd owners often concentrate on growing either one or the other.

Dexters produce a rich milk, relatively high in butterfat (4%) and the quality of the milk overall is similar to that of Jersey cattle.  Dexters can reasonably be expected to produce 1.5 to 2.5 gal (7.6 to 9.5 L) per day.

Beef animals in the US are expected to mature in 18–24 months and result in small cuts of high-quality, lean meat, graded US Choice, with little waste. The expected average dress out is 50 to 70%. The beef produced by Dexters is well marbled and tends to be dark.

See also
 Lowline cattle

References

External links

 Dexter Cattle Society UK
 American Dexter Cattle Association
 Dexter Cattle Society New Zealand
 Purebred Dexter Cattle Association
 Dexter Cattle Australia
 Canadian Dexter Cattle Association

Cattle breeds
Cattle breeds originating in Ireland
Conservation Priority Breeds of the Livestock Conservancy